Procottus is a genus of ray-finned fish belonging to the family Cottidae, the typical sculpins. These fishes are endemic to Lake Baikal in Russia.

Species
There are currently four recognized species in this genus:
 Procottus gotoi Sideleva, 2001
 Procottus gurwicii (Taliev, 1946) (Dwarf sculpin)
 Procottus jeittelesii (Dybowski, 1874) (Red sculpin)
 Procottus major Taliev, 1949

References

Abyssocottinae
 
Fish of Lake Baikal